Gornal Athletic Football Club is a football club based in Lower Gornal, Dudley, in the West Midlands county in England.

History
The club was established in 1945 under the name Lower Gornal Athletic. They joined the Worcestershire Combination. They finished bottom of the league in 1954–55. In 1963 the club transferred to the West Midlands (Regional) League, although their reserve team remained in Division Two of the Worcestershire Combination. When the West Midlands (Regional) League gained a second division in 1965, the club became members of the Premier Division.

In 1972 the club were renamed Gornal Athletic. Although they finished bottom of the Premier Division in 1978–79, they avoided being relegated. However, the 1979–80 season saw them finish second-from-bottom of the division, resulting in relegation to Division One. The club were Division One runners-up in 1983–84, and after finishing as runners-up again in 1993–94, they were promoted back to the Premier Division.

Gornal Athletic finished bottom of the Premier Division in 2002–03 and were relegated to Division One South. However, they won the division at the first attempt, earning an immediate promotion back to the Premier Division. They went on to finish second in the Premier Division in 2005–06. The club were Premier Division champions in 2011–12 and were promoted to the Midland Alliance. However, they were relegated back to the West Midlands (Regional) League Premier Division at the end of the 2013–14 season. In 2016–17 they finished bottom of the Premier Division and were relegated to Division One.

Honours
West Midlands (Regional) League
Premier Division champions 2011–12
Division One South champions 2003–04
Worcestershire Junior Cup
Winners 1962–63

Records
Best FA Cup performance: Third qualifying round, 1975–76
Best FA Trophy performance: Third qualifying round, 1971–72
Best FA Vase performance: Quarter-finals, 2012–13
Record transfer fee received: £2,100 from Cardiff City for George Andrews and Gary Bell, 1965–66

See also
Gornal Athletic F.C. players

References

External links
Official website

Football clubs in England
Football clubs in the West Midlands (county)
1945 establishments in England
Association football clubs established in 1945
Sport in Dudley
Midland Football Combination
West Midlands (Regional) League
Midland Football Alliance